Black-crowned babbler has been split into two species:

 Visayan babbler, Sterrhoptilus nigrocapitatus	
 Calabarzon babbler, Sterrhoptilus affinis

Birds by common name